Royal Tramp II is a 1992 Hong Kong film based on Louis Cha's novel The Deer and the Cauldron. The film is a sequel to Royal Tramp, which was released earlier in the same year.

Plot
Having been revealed as the false Empress Dowager, Lung-er returns to the Dragon Sect camp. There, the sect leader reminds her of their mission to support Ng Sam-kwai's, a military general, campaign for the throne before abdicating her title to Lung-er.

Siu-bo lounges at the brothel where he once worked but is then attacked by disciples of the One Arm Nun, an anti-Qing revolutionary figure, before being quickly subdued. When Siu-bo tries to take advantage of them, Ng Ying-hung, Ng Sam-kwai's son, exposes his lies. Scorned and unaware of the stranger's title, Siu-bo sends his men after Ying-Hung, but Lung-er, now disguised as Ying-hung's male bodyguard, easily fends them off.

At the palace, The Emperor, wary of Ng Sam-kwai's intentions, marries off the Princess to Ying-hung and assigns Siu-bo to be the Imperial Inspector General of the wedding march, so that he can keep his eyes on the general's activities. This complicates Siu-bo's relationship with Princess when she tells Siu-bo she's pregnant with his child.

The One Arm Nun and her disciple, Ah Ko, later ambushes the procession. Fighting to a standstill with Lung-er, the assailants escape with Ying-hung and Siu-bo. However, Siu-bo garners some respect from her when he reveals his dual identity as a Heaven and Earth Society commander. Lung-er finally catches up to them with reinforcements at an inn but only manages to rescue Siu-bo. Having been saved by Ying-hung before, Ah Ko elopes with him amid the confusion.

At the Dragon Sect camp, Ying-hung and Fung Sek-fan secretly poisons Lung-er and turn the followers against her. She escapes with Siu-bo but must have sex with a man before dawn, otherwise she will die. However, this will transfer 4/5th of her martial arts' power to whomever she sleeps with. Despite Siu-bo's lecherous personality, Lung-er accepts his blunt honesty as a sign of virtue and chooses to sacrifice her virginity to Siu-bo and becomes his third wife.

When Siu-bo gets back to the Princess, they execute a plan to castrate Ying-hung. With her betrothed no longer able to produce heirs, the Princess is taken by Siu-bo as his fourth wife. Enraged by the end of his family line, Ng Ying-hung prematurely gathers his troops and sets out to wage war with the Emperor. He tasks Fung Sek-fan with killing the Princess and Siu-bo. Though Chan Kan-nam manages to intervene and lets his disciple escape.

Later, the One Arm Nun captures the elopers, Ying-hung and Ah Ko, and offers them to Siu-bo. Siu-bo pardons them and even takes Ah Ko as his fifth wife. Afterward, Fung Sek-fan is promoted when he surrenders Ng Sam-kwai's battle plans and Chan Kan-nam to the Emperor. Given Siu-bo's muddied history with the Heaven and Earth Society, the Emperor tasks him with Chan's execution. Siu-bo's newfound power is difficult for him to control, and Chan helps him master it in time for him to use it against Fung. Siu-bo also uncovers the secret of the 42 Chapters books after burning them in frustration, revealing hidden stones that are left unburned, revealing map coordinates to the location of the treasure all major parties have been attempting to locate.

In order to save his master, Siu-bo defeats Fung with his newly acquired martial arts power after both falling into a hidden cave wherein the treasure is found, and swaps Feng's body with Chan's before the execution to save his master. And just as he was about to escape with his wives and Chan, the Emperor arrives with his troops, having been sold out by Siu-bo's opportunistic friend To-lung who is now involved romantically with Siu-bo's sister. But seeing that they are friends, his sister is in love with Siu-bo, and with Siu-bo bluffing that he's strong enough to demolish the Emperor and his entire army if he wanted, the Emperor lets them go, declaring that Siu-bo has died and no longer exists as far as he's concerned. Siu-bo laughs afterward that the Emperor fell for his bluff.

Cast
 Stephen Chow as Wai Siu-bo
 Brigitte Lin as Lung-er
 Chingmy Yau as Princess Kin-ning
 Michelle Reis as Ah Ko/Li Ming-ko
 Natalis Chan as To-lung
 Damian Lau as Chan Kan-nam
 Deric Wan as Hong-hei Emperor
 Kent Tong as Ng Ying-hung, Sam-kwai's son
 Paul Chun as Ng Sam-kwai
 Sandra Ng as Wai Chun-fa
 Fennie Yuen as Seung-yee twin
 Vivian Chan as Seung-yee twin
 Yen Shi-kwan as Fung Sek-fan
 Helen Ma as Kau-nan/one-armed Divine nun
 Sharla Cheung as Mo Tung-chu / Empress Dowager
 Law Lan as founder of Divine Dragon Sect
 Tam Suk-moi as Ah Nong
 Hoh Choi-chow as Palace guard Wen Shan Lun
 Yeung Jing-jing
 Wan Seung-lam
 Lee Fai
 Cheng Ka-sang
 Ho Wing-cheung
 Kwan Yung
 To Wai-wo

References

External links
 
 Royal Tramp II (1992) at Hong Kong Cinemagic
 
 

1992 films
Films based on works by Jin Yong
1990s adventure comedy films
Films directed by Wong Jing
Works based on The Deer and the Cauldron
Wuxia films
Films based on Chinese novels
Films set in the Qing dynasty
Golden Harvest films
Films directed by Gordon Chan
Hong Kong martial arts comedy films
Hong Kong sequel films
1992 comedy films
1990s Hong Kong films